The Federal Ministry of Defence, abbreviated BMVg, is a top-level federal agency, headed by the Federal Minister of Defence as a member of the Cabinet of Germany. The ministry is headquartered at the Hardthöhe district in Bonn and has a second office in the Bendlerblock building in Berlin, which is occasionally used colloquially to denote the entire Ministry.

According to Article 65a of the German Constitution (Grundgesetz), the Federal Minister of Defence is Commander-in-chief of the Bundeswehr, the German armed forces, with around 265,019 active soldiers and civilians. Article 115b decrees that in the state of defence, declared by the Bundestag with consent of the Bundesrat, the command in chief passes to the Chancellor.

The ministry currently has approximately 3,730 employees. Of these, 3,230 work in Bonn while around 500 work in the Bendlerblock building in Berlin.

Organization
On April 1, 2012, the Federal Ministry of Defence (DEU MOD) changes its organization to the following general structure:

Senior Management Level
Federal Minister of Defence (acts as High Commander of the German armed forces in peacetime)
2 Parliamentary Secretaries of State
2 Secretaries of State
 subordinated to the Senior Management
 Support Office
 Press & Information Office
 Politics Directorate

Directorates
Secretary of State #1
Equipment Directorate (lost the Cyber & IT branch in 2016)
Cyber & IT Directorate (founded 2016)
Secretary of State #2
 Financial & Controlling Directorate 
 Personnel Directorate 
 Infrastructure, Antipollution & Administrative Services Directorate 
 Legal Directorate 
Inspector General of the Bundeswehr
Plans & Policies Directorate 
Strategy & Operations Directorate 
Armed Forces Command & Control Directorate

Departments of the Federal armed forces
The Bundeswehr is divided into a military part (armed forces or Streitkräfte) and a civil part with the armed forces administration (Wehrverwaltung) and consists of 11 Departments/Services:
Armed Forces 
German Army (Heer)
German Navy (Marine)
German Air Force (Luftwaffe)
Bundeswehr Joint Medical Service (Zentraler Sanitätsdienst)
Joint Support Service (Streitkräftebasis) including the Center for Military History and Social Sciences of the Bundeswehr
Cyber- and Information Domain Service (Cyber- und Informationsraum)(founded in 2017 from parts of the Joint Support Service) 
Armed Forces Administration 
Personnel Management (Personal)
Information Technology & In-Service Management (Ausrüstung, Informationstechnologie und Nutzung)
Infrastructure, Antipollution & Administrative Services (Infrastruktur, Umweltschutz und Dienstleistungen)
Judicature (Recht)
Military Chaplaincy (Militärseelsorge)

Directly subordinated Offices & Agencies
Armed Forces Operational Command (Einsatzführungskommando der Bundeswehr)
Office for Military Aviation (Luftfahrtamt der Bundeswehr)
Office for Plans & Policies (Planungsamt der Bundeswehr)
Command & Control Academy (Führungsakademie der Bundeswehr)
Training Centre for Morale & Welfare (Zentrum Innere Führung)
Military Counter-intelligence Service (Bundesamt für den Militärischen Abschirmdienst)

History

19th century
From the Unification of Germany in 1871 until the end of World War I, the German Empire did not have a national Ministry of War. Instead the larger German states (such as the kingdoms of Prussia, Bavaria, Saxony and Württemberg), insisting on their autonomy, each had an own war ministry. According to the military agreements the Prussian minister president Otto von Bismarck had forged with the South German states on the eve of the Franco-Prussian War of 1870/71, the major states were responsible also for the defence of the smaller states. However, the Imperial Navy from 1889 was overseen by a federal department, the Imperial Naval Office.

Weimar and Nazi Germany

After the war and the German Revolution of 1918–19, the Weimar Constitution provided for a unified, national ministry of defence, which was created largely from the Prussian Ministry of War and the Imperial Naval Office. The Ministry of the Reichswehr was established in October 1919, and had its seat in the Bendlerblock building.

In the context of the Treaty of Versailles and the "Law for the Creation of a provisional Reichswehr" of March 1919, the Reichspräsident became the Commander-in-Chief of the armed forces, whilst the Reich Minister of Defence exercised military authority. Only in the Free State of Prussia did military authority remain with the State Minister of War. After the Weimar Constitution came into force, the remaining war ministries in the states of Bavaria, Saxony, Württemberg and Prussia were abolished and military authority was concentrated in the Reich Minister of Defence. Command was exercised respectively by the Chief of the Heeresleitung (Army Command) and the Chief of the Marineleitung (Navy Command, see Reichsmarine). In 1929 a third office was established: the Ministerial Office, whose Chief functioned as the political representative of the Minister. The role of the General Staff was filled by the Truppenamt.

The Social Democratic politician Gustav Noske became the first Minister of Defence of Germany. After the Nazi Machtergreifung, when the Reichswehr was recreated as the Wehrmacht in 1935, the ministry was renamed Reichskriegsministerium (Reich Ministry of War); also, the Heeresleitung became the Oberkommando des Heeres (OKH), the Marineleitung became the Oberkommando der Marine (OKM) and the Oberkommando der Luftwaffe (OKL) was newly created. The Ministeramt (Ministerial Office) was renamed the Wehrmachtsamt.

In 1938, following the Blomberg-Fritsch Affair, Hitler himself exercised the functions of the Reich War Minister. The Wehrmachtsamt was turned into the Oberkommando der Wehrmacht (OKW; High Command of the Armed Forces), which formally existed until the end of World War II. The High Command was not a government ministry, but a military command, however.

Post-WW2
After World War II, West Germany started with preparations for rearmament (Wiederbewaffnung) in 1950, as ordered by Chancellor Konrad Adenauer. After the outbreak of the Korean War, the United States called for a West German contribution to the defence of Western Europe (against the Soviet Union). Initially Gerhard Graf von Schwerin, a former Wehrmacht General, advised the Chancellor on these issues and led the preparations, but after Count Schwerin had talked to the press about his work, he was replaced by Theodor Blank, who was appointed as "Special Representative" of the Chancellor. As the rearmament plans met with harsh opposition by a wide circle within the West German population and contradicted the occupation statute, the government office responsible for the rearmament acted secretly, unofficially known as Amt Blank. By 1955, the number of employees had surpassed 1,300. On 7 June 1955 the office became the Ministry of Defence, or Bundesministerium für Verteidigung in German. The Bundeswehr was established and Germany joined the NATO the same year. In 1956, Germany reintroduced conscription, and the German military force quickly became the largest conventional military force in Western Europe. To confirm the ministry's importance, it was renamed Bundesministerium der Verteidigung on 30 December 1961, similar to the German names of the "classic" ministries of Finance, the Interior and Justice — though the federal minister is still denoted as Bundesminister für Verteidigung in Article 65a of the German Constitution.

Until 1960, the ministry had its seat in the Ermekeil barracks in Bonn. From 1960 onwards, it was moved to a new building complex at Hardthöhe.

Post-reunification
After German reunification, the Bendlerblock, former seat of its Weimar Republic predecessor, became the secondary seat of the ministry in 1993. The German military has become increasingly engaged in international operations since the early 1990s, and saw combat in the 1999 Kosovo War.

21st century

Until the Fall of Kabul in August 2021, Germany deployed for nearly 20 years its armed forces in Afghanistan as part of the International Security Assistance Force (2001-2015) and later the Resolute Support Mission (2015-2021). German forces withdrew on 29 June.

List of Federal Ministers of Defence (since 1955)

Political Party:

See also
List of German defence ministers

References

External links
 

Bundeswehr
Defence
Defence
Germany
Ministries established in 1955
1955 establishments in West Germany
Germany